Sclerobunus idahoensis is a species of armoured harvestman in the family Paranonychidae. It is found in North America.

References

Further reading

 
 

Harvestmen
Articles created by Qbugbot
Animals described in 1971